Katie Ford may refer to:

Katie Ford (poet)
Katie Ford (CEO)
Katie Ford (screenwriter)

See also
Catherine Ford (disambiguation)